Conasprella tirardi is a species of sea snail, a marine gastropod mollusk in the family Conidae, the cone snails and their allies.

Description
The length of the shell varies between 17 mm and 31 mm.

Distribution
This marine species occurs off New Caledonia, the Tuamotus and the Pitcairn Islands.

References

Conus (Gastropoda, Conidae) from offshore French Polynesia: Description of dredging from TARASOC expedition, with new records and new species. Xenophora Taxonomy 5: 26-49
 Monnier E., Limpalaër L., Robin A. & Roux C. (2018). A taxonomic iconography of living Conidae. Harxheim: ConchBooks. 2 vols. 1205 pp. page(s): 199

External links
 Gastropods.com: Conus (Rhizoconus) tirardi
 Röckel, D. and Moolenbeek, R. G. 1996. Conus tirardi, a new species from the Pacific Ocean (Gastropoda: Conidae). Vita Marina 44(1/2):47-51, pl. 1
 MNHN, Paris : holotype

tirardi
Gastropods described in 1996